William John Wightkin (July 28, 1927 – January 25, 1997) was an American football player.

Career
He played offensive tackle, defensive tackle and end for eight seasons between 1950 and 1957 for the Chicago Bears.

External links

 

1997 deaths
1927 births
American football offensive linemen
Chicago Bears players
Western Conference Pro Bowl players
Notre Dame Fighting Irish football players
Players of American football from Detroit
Detroit Catholic Central High School alumni